An antique shop (or antiques shop) is a retail store specializing in the selling of antiques. Antiques shops can be located either locally or, with the advent of the Internet, found online.

An antiques shop can also be located within an antique mall, where an individual antique seller can open a booth or stall and display their personal or family items for sale within the mall. These mini-malls are a form of consignment shop, and are often located inside where previous large retailers such as grocery stores have moved out or closed outright.

Normally stores' stock is sourced from auctions, estate sales, flea markets, garage sales, etc. Many items may pass through multiple antiques dealers along the product chain before arriving in a retail antiques shop. By their very nature, these shops sell unique items and are typically willing to buy items, even from individuals. The quality of these items may vary from very low to extremely high and expensive, depending on the nature and location of the shop.

Frequently, many antique shops will be clustered together in nearby locations; in the same town such as in many places in New England, on the same street such as on Portobello Road or Camden in London, or in an antique mall.

Antiques shops may specialize in some particular segment of the market such as antique furniture or jewelry, but many shops stock a wide variety of inventory. Some shops are online-only sellers; they have no physical retail location.

See also 
 Bric-a-brac
 Junk shop

References

Retailers by type of merchandise sold
Antiques
Reuse